The 568 Presidents Group is a consortium of American universities and colleges practicing need-blind admissions. The group was founded in 1998 in response to section 568 of the Improving America's Schools Act of 1994.

History
In response to several prestigious colleges and universities holding "Overlap Meetings" to set similar tuition and financial aid levels, the Justice Department began an antitrust investigation in 1989 and in 1991 filed a Sherman Antitrust Act suit against 57 colleges and universities. While the Ivy League institutions settled, MIT contested the charges on the grounds that the practice was not anticompetitive because it prevented bidding wars over promising students from consuming funds for need-based scholarships and ensured the availability of aid for the greatest number of students. MIT ultimately prevailed when the Justice Department settled the case in 1994.

In 1994, Congress passed the Improving America's Schools Act. Section 568 of this Act expands upon the issues in the MIT settlement. Section 568 states that is not unlawful under the antitrust laws for two or more need-blind institutions to agree or attempt to agree:
 to award financial aid only on the basis of need;
 to use common principles of analysis for determining need;
 to use a common aid application form; and
 to engage in a one-time exchange of certain pre-award data of commonly admitted financial aid students.

The amendment specifically prohibits the sharing of any information on the amount or terms of any prospective, individual aid award and makes clear that the exemption does not apply to the awarding of federal financial aid.

Membership
The following is a list of member institutions:

Amherst College
Boston College
California Institute of Technology
Claremont McKenna College
Columbia University
Cornell University
Dartmouth College
Davidson College
Georgetown University
Grinnell College
Johns Hopkins University
Massachusetts Institute of Technology
Middlebury College
Northwestern University
Pomona College
Rice University
Swarthmore College
University of Notre Dame
Wellesley College
Williams College
Yale University

Former members
The following colleges have in the past been members of the 568 Group but are not currently (as of August 2022):

College of the Holy Cross
Duke University
Haverford College
St. John's College
University of Pennsylvania
Vanderbilt University

References

External links
 Official website

College and university associations and consortia in the United States
1998 establishments in the United States
Organizations established in 1998